Uncaria rhynchophylla or the cat's claw herb is a plant species used in traditional Chinese medicine.

(+)-Catechin and (-)-epicatechin are found in the plant as well as the alkaloid rhynchophylline.

References

External links

rhynchophylla
Plants used in traditional Chinese medicine